Frank Archibald or Frank C. Archibald may refer to:

 Frank Archibald (died 1975), Aboriginal Australian elder in honour of whom the Frank Archibald Memorial Lecture at the University of New England was named
 Frank C. Archibald (Newfoundland politician) (1887–1972), Canadian politician
 Frank C. Archibald (Vermont politician) (1857–1935), American politician and attorney